Icheon Seo clan is one of the Korean clans. Their Bon-gwan is in Icheon, Gyeonggi Province. According to the research held in 2015, the number of Icheon Seo clan was 199792. Their founder was  who was a descendant of King Jun of Gojoseon, the Gija Joseon’s last king. He lived at seoaseong in Icheon. He named their surname after the name of the place “Icheon”.

See also 
 Korean clan names of foreign origin

References

External links 
 

 
Seo clans
Gija Joseon
Korean clan names of Chinese origin